Alexander Marshall Field (born December 23, 1986) is a former American football defensive end. He was signed by the Arizona Cardinals as an undrafted free agent in 2009. He played college football at Virginia.

Field is a graduate of Broad Run High School in Ashburn, Virginia.

Field has also been a member of the Cleveland Browns.

References and external links
Arizona Cardinals player page
Virginia Cavaliers player page

1986 births
Living people
Sportspeople from Nashua, New Hampshire
People from Ashburn, Virginia
Players of American football from Virginia
American football defensive ends
Virginia Cavaliers football players
Arizona Cardinals players
Cleveland Browns players